Víctor Nicolás Suárez Céspedes (born 20 May 1982) is a Chilean retired footballer.

External links
 
 Nicolás Suárez at Football-Lineups

1982 births
Living people
Chilean footballers
Colo-Colo footballers
Curicó Unido footballers
Unión La Calera footballers
Unión San Felipe footballers
Deportes Melipilla footballers
Everton de Viña del Mar footballers
Chilean Primera División players
Primera B de Chile players
Association football central defenders
Unión San Felipe managers